The New Britain Public High School Campus is a historic suite of former school buildings at 50 Bassett Street and 161 South Main Street in New Britain, Connecticut.  The campus's oldest building, opened in 1896, was one of the first public high schools in Connecticut, and is a good example of Renaissance Revival architecture.  The campus was repeated enlarged during the 20th century with the addition of trade and vocational components, and served the city as a high school until the 1970s, when it was converted to housing.

The campus was listed on the National Register of Historic Places in 2015.

See also
National Register of Historic Places listings in Hartford County, Connecticut

References

National Register of Historic Places in Hartford County, Connecticut
Government buildings on the National Register of Historic Places in Connecticut
School buildings completed in 1896
Buildings and structures in New Britain, Connecticut
1896 establishments in Connecticut